Boris Benjamin Bertram (born 29 December 1971) is a Danish film director, keynote speaker, producer and partner in Good Company Pictures, a documentary production company based in Copenhagen.

Life and career 
Bertram studied documentary film making at National Film School of Denmark and Social Psychology and Communication at Roskilde University.

Bertram worked as a radio journalist at Copenhagen Homeless Radio. In 1999, he joined the creative department of Zentropa Real and worked on the documentaries The Five Obstructions and The Erotic Man as an assistant director with Lars Von Trier and Jørgen Leth. He has directed a few television series for DR1 and TV2.

Bertram's films focus on international issues and conflict resolution. In 2018, he directed the documentary The Human Shelter with the support of IKEA, with both concerned to talk about what makes a home around the world.

In 2019, he directed Photographer of War, which follows Danish war photographer Jan Grarup. The film was nominated for a Robert Award from the Danish Academy Awards.

Filmography 
 An Elephant in the Room (2020) – Executive producer
 Prelle – In My Own Voice (2020) – Executive producer
 Photographer of War/Krigsfotografen (2019) – Film Director, cinematographer
 Don't Give a Fox (2019) – Executive Producer
 The Human Shelter (2018) – Film Director, producer
 False Confessions (2018) – Executive Producer
 Heroes of Hell/Helvedes helte (2014) – Film Director
 The War Campaign/Krigskampagnen (2013) – Film Director
 The Seduced Man/Det forførte menneske (2011) – Film Photographer
 The Erotic Human (2010) – Assistant director: Brazil
 Chips & Liver Girls (2010) – Film Director
 Tank City/Tankograd (2009) – Film Director
 Diplomacy: The Responsibility to Protect (2008) – Film Director
 Great Danes/Store danskere (2005) – Film director
 My Beirut (2005) – Film Director

Awards

References

External links 
 Official website
 Boris Benjamin Bertram on IMDb

Danish documentary film directors
Film directors from Copenhagen
1971 births
Danish film producers
Living people